Molenpolder is a hamlet in the municipality of Stichtse Vecht, province of Utrecht, the Netherlands. Within this municipality Molenpolder belongs to the village of Tienhoven.

Until 2011 the hamlet was part of the former municipality of Maarssen. Including a number of bungalow parks about 900 people are living in Molenplder.

Stichtse Vecht also contains a wet nature reserve called , bordering the hamlet of Molenpolder.

References 

Populated places in Utrecht (province)
Stichtse Vecht